Fluorescence interference contrast (FLIC) microscopy is a microscopic technique developed to achieve z-resolution on the nanometer scale.

FLIC occurs whenever fluorescent objects are in the vicinity of a reflecting surface (e.g. Si wafer). The resulting interference between the direct and the reflected light leads to a double sin2 modulation of the intensity, I, of a fluorescent object as a function of distance, h, above the reflecting surface. This allows for the nanometer height measurements.

FLIC microscope is well suited to measuring the topography of a membrane that contains fluorescent
probes e.g. an artificial lipid bilayer, or a living cell membrane or the structure of fluorescently labeled proteins on a surface.

FLIC optical theory

General two layer system
The optical theory underlying FLIC was developed by Armin Lambacher and Peter Fromherz.  They derived a relationship between the observed fluorescence intensity and the distance of the fluorophore from  a reflective silicon surface.

The observed fluorescence intensity, is the product of the excitation probability per unit time, and the probability of measuring an emitted photon per unit time, .  Both probabilities are a function of the fluorophore height above the silicon surface, so the observed intensity will also be a function of the fluorophore height.  The simplest arrangement to consider is a fluorophore embedded in silicon dioxide (refractive index ) a distance d from an interface with silicon (refractive index ).  The fluorophore is excited by light of wavelength  and emits light of wavelength .  The unit vector  gives the orientation of the transition dipole of excitation of the fluorophore.   is proportional to the squared projection of the local electric field, which includes the effects of interference, on the direction of the transition dipole. 

 

The local electric field, at the fluorophore is affected by interference between the direct incident light and the light reflecting off the silicon surface.  The interference is quantified by the phase difference  given by

 is the angle of the incident light with respect to the silicon plane normal. Not only does interference modulate , but the silicon surface does not perfectly reflect the incident light. Fresnel coefficients give the change in amplitude between an incident and reflected wave. The angles  and  can be related by Snell's Law. The expressions for the reflection coefficients are:

TE refers to the component of the electric field perpendicular to the plane of incidence and TM to the parallel component (The incident plane is defined by the plane normal and the propagation direction of the light).  In cartesian coordinates, the local electric field is 

 is the polarization angle of the incident light with respect to the plane of incidence.  The orientation of the excitation dipole is a function of its angle  to the normal and  azimuthal to the plane of incidence.  

Many of the parameters used above would vary in a normal experiment.  The variation in the five following parameters should be included in this theoretical description.
 The coherence of the excitation light 
 The incident angle of excitation light 
 Polarization angle of the excitation light 
 The angle of transition dipole of the fluorophore  
 The wavelength of the excitation light
The squared projection  must be averaged over these quantities to give the probability of excitation .  Averaging over the first 4 parameters gives

Normalization factors are not included.   is a distribution of the orientation angle of the fluorophore dipoles.  The azimuthal angle  and the polarization angle  are integrated over analytically, so they no longer appear in the above equation.  To finally obtain the probability of excitation per unit time, the above equation is integrated over the spread in excitation wavelength, accounting for the intensity  and the extinction coefficient of the fluorophore .

The steps to calculate  are equivalent to those above in calculating  except that the parameter labels em are replaced with ex and in is replaced with out.

The resulting fluorescence intensity measured is proportional to the product of the excitation probability and emission probability

It is important to note that this theory determines a proportionality relation between the measured fluorescence intensity  and the distance of the fluorophore above the reflective surface.  The fact that it is not an equality relation will have a significant effect on the experimental procedure.

Experimental Setup
A silicon wafer is typically used as the reflective surface in a FLIC experiment.  An oxide layer is then thermally grown on top of the silicon wafer to act as a spacer.  On top of the oxide is placed the fluorescently labeled specimen, such as a lipid membrane, a cell or membrane bound proteins.   
With the sample system built, all that is needed is an epifluorescence microscope and a CCD camera to make quantitative intensity measurements.

The silicon dioxide thickness is very important in making accurate FLIC measurements.  As mentioned before, the theoretical model describes the relative fluorescence intensity measured versus the fluorophore height.  The fluorophore position cannot be simply read off of a single measured FLIC curve.    The basic procedure is to manufacture the oxide layer with at least two known thicknesses (the layer can be made with photolithographic techniques and the thickness measured by ellipsometry).  The thicknesses used depends on the sample being measured.  For a sample with fluorophore height in the range of 10 nm, oxide thickness around 50 nm would be best because the FLIC intensity curve is steepest here and would produce the greatest contrast between fluorophore heights.  Oxide thickness above a few hundred nanometers could be problematic because the curve begins to get smeared out by polychromatic light and a range of incident angles.  A ratio of measured fluorescence intensities at different oxide thicknesses is compared to the predicted ratio to calculate the fluorophore height above the oxide.  

The above equation can then be solved numerically to find .
Imperfections of the experiment, such as imperfect reflection, nonnormal incidence of light and polychromatic light tend to smear out the sharp fluorescence curves.  The spread in incidence angle can be controlled by the numerical aperture (N.A.).  However, depending on the numerical aperture used, the experiment will yield good lateral resolution (x-y) or good vertical resolution (z), but not both.  A high N.A. (~1.0) gives good lateral resolution which is best if the goal is to determine long range topography.  Low N.A. (~0.001), on the other hand, provides accurate z-height measurement to determine the height of a fluorescently labeled molecule in a system.

Analysis

The basic analysis involves fitting the intensity data with the theoretical model allowing the distance of the fluorophore above the oxide surface to be a free parameter.
The FLIC curves shift to the left as the distance of the fluorophore above the oxide increases.   is usually the parameter of interest, but several other free parameters are often included to optimize the fit.  Normally an amplitude factor (a) and a constant additive term for the background (b) are included.  The amplitude factor scales the relative model intensity and the constant background shifts the curve up or down to account for fluorescence coming from out of focus areas, such as the top side of a cell.  Occasionally the numerical aperture (N.A.) of the microscope is allowed to be a free parameter in the fitting.  The other parameters entering the optical theory, such as different indices of refraction, layer thicknesses and light wavelengths, are assumed constant with some uncertainty.
A FLIC chip may be made with oxide terraces of 9 or  16 different heights arranged in blocks.  After a fluorescence image is captured, each 9 or 16 terrace block yields a separate FLIC curve that defines a unique .  The average  is found by compiling all the  values into a histogram.

The statistical error in the calculation of  comes from two sources: the error in fitting of the optical theory to the data and the uncertainty in the thickness of the oxide layer.  Systematic error comes from three sources: the measurement of the oxide thickness (usually by ellipsometer), the fluorescence intensity measurement with the CCD, and the uncertainty in the parameters used in the optical theory.  The systematic error has been estimated to be .

References 

 

Microscopy
Nanotechnology